The 1886 MIT Engineers football team was an American football team that represented the Massachusetts Institute of Technology as an independent during the 1886 college football season. The team compiled a 2–6–1 record.

Schedule

References

MIT
MIT Engineers football seasons
MIT Engineers football